Roger Cook may refer to:

 Roger Cook (graphic designer) (born 1930), American artist
 Roger Cook (journalist) (born 1943), New Zealand investigative journalist, best known in the UK
 Roger Cook (landscaper), head landscaper on the PBS show This Old House
 Roger Cook (politician), politician from Western Australia
 Roger Cook (songwriter) (born 1940), British
 Roger Cook, British academic and artist; played Christ in Derek Jarman's film The Garden
 Roger Noel Cook (born 1946), British comics writer, musician and magazine publisher